, also known as Under the Same Moon, is a Japanese manga series written and illustrated by Seiki Tsuchida. It was serialized in Shogakukan's seinen manga magazine Weekly Young Sunday from 1998 to 2000, with its chapters collected in 7 tankōbon volumes. It was adapted into a live-action film, which premiered in Japan in November 2005.

Media

Manga
Shogakukan collected its chapters in seven tankōbon volumes, released from October 5, 1998, to April 5, 2000.

The manga was published in France by Casterman.

Live-action film
A live-action film adaptation premiered in Japan on November 19, 2005. It was directed by Kenta Fukasaku and written by Junichi Mori, starring Yosuke Kubozuka, Meisa Kuroki, Edison Chen, Taro Yamamoto, Matsuo Suzuki and Kyoko Kishida. It was distributed by Toei Company.

Reception
The manga received the Excellence Award at the 3rd Japan Media Arts Festival in 1999.

The live-action film debuted at #8 at the Japanese box office, and had earned $751,210.

See also
 Henshū Ō, another manga series illustrated by Seiki Tsuchida
 Yomawari Sensei, another manga series illustrated by Seiki Tsuchida

References

External links
 

Seinen manga
Shogakukan manga